Hotel Kaiserhof was a luxury hotel in Wilhelmplatz, Berlin, Germany. It opened in October 1875.  It was located next to the Reich Chancellery in what was at the time the city's "government quarter".

Berlin's first "grand hotel" it was the creation of the "Berlin Hotel AG" company, founded in 1872 and subsequently renamed "Berliner Hotelgesellschaft". The commission for the building went to the architects Hude & Hennicke. A few days after the opening ceremony in October 1875 the building was destroyed by fire. It reopened in 1876.

The Kaiserhof offered more than 260 rooms which were fitted out in a modern and luxurious manner.   It was the first Berlin hotel in which every room had an electricity supply, its own bathroom and its own telephone.   The hotel also featured steam heating, pneumatic elevators/lifts.   The kitchens used gas cookers.   Electric power came from Berlin's second power station, recently built in Mauerstraße by Siemens & Halske.

British PM Benjamin Disraeli stayed here in 1878.

Joseph Goebbels, Ernst Röhm, and other Nazi officials met in the Kaiserhof as Hitler was being sworn in as Chancellor. They were not aware if Hitler had indeed been appointed Chancellor until he had returned to the hotel to inform them.

Dr. Ludwig Roselius had a luxury suite in the Hotel and Barbara Goette cared for him for many months until he died there on 15 May 1943.

On 22 November 1943 the hotel was badly damaged by British bombers during an air-raid on Berlin.  The ruins ended up in East Berlin after the division of the city and were later completely torn down. The present-day Mohrenstraße station on the  line of the Berlin U-Bahn was named "Kaiserhof" from its opening in 1908 until 1950. The station underwent several name changes before acquiring its current name in 1991.

In 1974 the North Korean embassy to East Germany was constructed on the site. East Germany ceased to be a state in 1990 and the embassy closed. However, in 2001 its successor state, the Federal Republic of Germany, re-established diplomatic relations with North Korea and the North Korean embassy returned to the building. Since 2004, the annex on the south half of the site has been leased to Cityhostel Berlin, which pays the North Korean government an estimated €38,000 per month.

In November 1939, Georg Elser's family was imprisoned in the hotel for interrogation in the objective to find out if they contributed towards the assassination attempt on Hitler's life on November 8 in the Bürgerbräukeller, Munich. Even though they were imprisoned, it was like a holiday to Berlin in the Kaiserhof. However, they were monitored everywhere by the Gestapo

References

Hotels in Berlin
Berlin Hotel Kaiserhof
Berlin Hotel Kaiserhof
Berlin Hotel Kaiserhof
Berlin Hotel Kaiserhof
Berlin Hotel Kaiserhof
Buildings and structures in Berlin destroyed during World War II
Demolished hotels
1875 in Germany